George Dunlap may refer to:

 George W. Dunlap (1813–1880), U.S. Representative from Kentucky
 George Dunlap (golfer) (1908–2003), American amateur golfer